Shenandoah High School is a public high school located near Middletown, Indiana in Henry County.

The school was created out of the consolidation of the high schools in Sulphur Springs, Cadiz, and Middletown in 1967.  The school (and school district) was named after settlers who came to the area from the Shenandoah Valley in Virginia.

See also
 List of high schools in Indiana

References

External links
 Official Website

Public high schools in Indiana
Buildings and structures in Henry County, Indiana